Mayak is a rural locality (a village) in Bikkulovsky Selsoviet, Miyakinsky District, Bashkortostan, Russia. The population was 122 as of 2010. There are 3 streets.

Geography 
Mayak is located 30 km northeast of Kirgiz-Miyaki (the district's administrative centre) by road. 2-ye Miyakibashevo is the nearest rural locality.

References 

Rural localities in Miyakinsky District